Pycnarmon schematospila is a moth in the family Crambidae. It was described by Edward Meyrick in 1937. It is found in Tanzania.

References

Moths described in 1937
Spilomelinae
Moths of Africa